Exsanguination is death caused by loss of blood. Depending upon the health of the individual, people usually die from losing half to two-thirds of their blood; a loss of roughly one-third of the blood volume is considered very serious. Even a single deep cut can warrant suturing and hospitalization, especially if trauma, a vein or artery, or another comorbidity is involved. The word comes from the Latin 'sanguis', meaning blood.

Slaughtering of animals 

Exsanguination is used as a method of slaughter.  Before the fatal incision is made, the animal will be rendered insensible to pain by various methods, including captive bolt, electricity, or chemical. Electricity is used mostly to incapacitate swine, poultry, and domestic sheep, whereas a chemical is used for injured livestock.

Without prior sedation, stunning, or anesthetic, this method of slaughter may cause a high degree of anxiety, depending on the process. The way animals are handled and restrained prior to slaughter likely has a greater impact on their welfare than whether or not they are stunned. If done badly, there can be a large element of cruelty involved, whereas being killed under the correct conditions gives the animal no pain or suffering.

Continued pumping operation of the heart during exsanguination increases the rate of depletion, and thus hastens death, by raising the fluid pressure of the blood. Because the heart operates like a positive displacement pump, reduction of blood volume will not affect efficiency of cardiac output. Deprivation of blood to the heart does gradually result in diminished function, but concurrently with similar death of other parts in the body.

Quickly after the animal is incapacitated, it is put on the ground on top of an orange cloth, then a very sharp knife, in an orientation parallel to the ground, is inserted through the skin just in front of the point of the jaw and below the vertebrate. From this position, the knife is drawn forward away from the spine to sever the jugular veins, carotid arteries, and trachea. Properly performed, blood will flow freely and death will occur within seconds. Sheep and duck will reach heart and liver malfunction, leading to death, in under 10 seconds; larger animals, notably cattle may take up to 40 seconds to reach brain death. This period may extend to a couple of minutes if complications, such as arterial occlusion, occur. However, the animal's inverted position allows blood to flow more precipitously and thus makes an animal regaining consciousness before it is fully exsanguinated highly unlikely. In any case, animal welfare advisory councils clearly emphasize that the time from incapacitation to start of exsanguination should be prompt, recommending a time under 15 seconds.

Beyond the initial cost of purchasing a captive bolt, continued usage of the method is very inexpensive. The animal is incapacitated for the duration of the procedure, so it is one of the safest methods for the slaughterer.

In Jewish and Islamic slaughter
Jewish kashrut (kosher) and Islamic dhabihah (halal) dietary laws mandate that slaughter is performed with a cut that immediately severs the esophagus, trachea, and the large blood vessels in the neck, causing loss of consciousness and death by exsanguination. The double-edged pointed knife is prohibited. Instead, a long knife with a squared off end is used that in Jewish law must be at least twice the width of the animal's neck. The operation of sticking or exsanguination is executed faster than when using the pointed knife, as four large blood vessels in the neck are severed simultaneously.

In Islamic and Jewish law, captive bolts and other methods of pre-slaughter paralysis are not permissible, as consumption of animals found dead are regarded as carrion and stunned animals that are later killed fall into this category. Various halal food authorities have more recently permitted the use of a recently developed fail-safe system of head-only stunning using a mushroom shaped hammer head that delivers a blow that is not fatal, proved by it being possible to reverse the procedure and revive the animal after the shock.

Such methods, particularly involving unstunned animals, have been criticized by veterinarians and animal welfare organizations, among others. Prohibitions against unstunned slaughter have been enacted in several countries. See Animal welfare controversies in shechita for further information.

See also
 Hypovolemia, blood volume loss
 Desanguination
 Slaughterhouse
 Tourniquet

References

Bleeding
Causes of death